Lycée Français de La Havane Alejo Carpentier, formerly École Française de la Havane "Alejo Carpentier", is a French international school with two campuses in Siboney in Playa, Havana, Cuba: one for primary school and one for collège and lycée (junior and senior high school).

It was established in 1972. As of 2015 its students come from 29 countries and are a total of 200 people.

It directly teaches elementary through junior high school and uses the CNED programme for senior high school.

See also

 Cuba–France relations

References

External links
  Lycée Français de La Havane Alejo Carpentier
  Lycée Français de La Havane Alejo Carpentier

Schools in Havana
Havana
International schools in Cuba
Educational institutions established in 1972
Cuba–France relations